Amanda Polchies is a Lakota Sioux and Mikmaq woman who lives in Elsipogtog First Nation. She became known for an iconic image taken of her while participating in a protest against hydraulic fracturing near the village of Rexton, New Brunswick.

Protest event
The area was a potential site for shale gas development. The protest turned violent after Royal Canadian Mounted Police attempted to enforce a court injunction against the protesters' blockade. A line of women formed a blockade by linking arms in the highway in front of the police. Polchies received an eagle's feather from a young girl during the heat of the protest, and got down on her knees to pray with the feather aloft. She was soon after taken into custody by the police for not complying with their orders to back away from the officers.

At the protest, she was photographed by Inuk journalist Ossie Michelin while kneeling and raising an eagle feather in front of the Royal Canadian Mounted Police. The original iPhone image was tweeted by Ossie Michelin on October 17, 2013 at 9:07am. This photo went viral on Twitter and other social media platforms. The photo was even part of a national exhibit at the Canadian Museum for Human Rights in Winnipeg. It was deemed best photograph in the museum's Points of View: A National Human Rights Photography Exhibition. This image was adopted by the Idle No More movement, which protested Canada's Bill C-45 that allowed for State encroachment on Indigenous environmental rights.

Additional renditions and images
The viral image led to multiple unique renditions of Michelin's original picture. These images came in support of the Idle No More Movement, #NODAPL Movement, and more.

 Nicolas Lampert's Graphic Image Supporting The #NODAPL Movement
 RCMP Taking Polchies Away From The Protest Pt. 1
 RCMP Taking Polchies Away From The Protest Pt. 2

References

First Nations activists
Mi'kmaq people
Living people
Idle No More
20th-century First Nations people
21st-century First Nations people
Year of birth missing (living people)
2010s photographs
Photographs of protests
People notable for being the subject of a specific photograph
First Nations women